David Hill (born May 21, 1946) is an Australian-born American executive producer who served as the president of Fox Sports from 1993 to 2000, and as a senior EVP of 21st Century Fox for twenty-four years.

Biography

After starting out at the Sydney Daily Telegraph and then working at Nine Network, he was hired by Rupert Murdoch's 21st Century Fox in 1988 to help launch Sky Television and then Eurosport.  In 1990, he took over BSkyB sports channel and created Sky Sports in 1991.  He then led the startup of Fox Sports and NFL on Fox in 1993 when the network won National Football League TV broadcasting rights, and introduced many new concepts including the FoxBox, the 1st & Ten virtual first down line and making the broadcasts more entertaining.

He left the Fox Group in June 2015 to open his own production company that focused on live TV events. In 2014 Hill became a chairman of National Geographic Channels. He served as an executive producer of the American version of The X Factor and the fifteenth season of American Idol.

Academy Award producer
He along with Reginald Hudlin were chosen to produce the 88th Academy Awards after the end of a third term deal with previous producers Craig Zadan and Neil Meron.

Filmography
 Fox NFL Sunday
 NHL on FOX 
 Daytona 500: The Great American Race Pre-Race Show
 2008 NASCAR Samsung 500
 2008 Crown Royal Presents the Dan Lowry 400
 2011 World Series
 American Idol (2014-2015) 
 The X Factor 
 88th Academy Awards (with Reginald Hudlin)

Awards

Hill won an Outstanding Live Sports Special award at 33rd Sports Emmys for producing 2011 World Series. In 2017 he received the Pete Rozelle Radio-Television Award from the Pro Football Hall of Fame.

In 2014 he was inducted into the Sports Broadcasting Hall of Fame.

References

External links

1946 births
Living people
American film producers
American television executives
Australian emigrants to the United States
Fox Broadcasting Company executives
Fox Sports
People from Newcastle, New South Wales
Pete Rozelle Radio-Television Award recipients